Glover is an unincorporated community and coal town in Wyoming County, West Virginia, United States.

References

Unincorporated communities in West Virginia
Unincorporated communities in Wyoming County, West Virginia
Coal towns in West Virginia
Populated places on the Guyandotte River